Taste the Sin is the third full-length album of the sludge metal band Black Tusk. It was released on May 25, 2010 through Relapse Records. It blends elements of sludge metal, stoner metal, thrash metal and hardcore punk combined with vocals by all band members to create a sound similar to Kylesa and Baroness, contributing to Savannah's Sludge music scene.

Track listing
All songs were written by Black Tusk.

Personnel
Black Tusk
Andrew Fidler – Guitar, Vocals
Jonathan Athon – Bass, Vocals
James May – Drums, Vocals

Guest
Jason Statts - Vocals on "Unleash the Wrath"

Production
John Dyer Baizley – Cover art, Design
Orion Landau - Design
Geoff L. Johnson - Photography
Dave Harris - Mastering
Steve Slavich - Engineering
Jay Matheson - Engineering
Chris "Scary" Adams - Engineering on "Toe Fry" for deluxe version

References

2010 albums
Black Tusk (band) albums
Relapse Records albums
Albums with cover art by John Dyer Baizley